Summit High School in Fontana, California, is one of five comprehensive high schools in the Fontana Unified School District. It is located at 15551 Summit Avenue. The Summit Branch Public Library is located on the school campus. The school was opened on September 5, 2006.

Demographics
In 2013, enrollment was 2,554 students from diversified backgrounds: 70.7% Hispanic or Latino, 13.5% African American, 8.3% White, 4.2% Filipino, 2.2% Asian, 0.2% American Indian, 0.2% Pacific Islander and 0.7% other ethnic backgrounds.

School motto
The school mission statement is "We Can't Spell Summit Without U!"

American football team
Summit High School is known for its American football program, which has found success in the Sunkist League. In the 2011–12 season, Summit won the CIF-SS championship and was ranked 37th in the state of California.

Notable alumni
 Jillian Alleyne, basketball player
Jamaal Williams, football player
Donte Deayon, football player
Jalin Turner, mma fighter

References

External links
 

Education in Fontana, California
High schools in San Bernardino County, California
Public high schools in California
2006 establishments in California